O Mirante (The Observatory) is a weekly regional newspaper published in Portugal, with three editions covering three regions of the Tagus valley. It covers sports, health, culture, leisure and general local information.

O Mirante was first published on 16 November 1987 in Chamusca, as a 16-page monthly magazine with a circulation of 2000 copies. In April 1991, it became a biweekly publication with 24 pages. In March 1994, it began being printed in Lisbon, and in September 1995 it became a weekly newspaper.
In April 2000 the company bought El Jornal of the Tagus Valley, expanding its regional coverage; and in September 2003 it merged with the Belvedere, increasing total circulation to 35,000.

The newspaper went online in November 2002, and in October 2004 began providing daily updates to the online edition. The newspaper is privately owned by the Emídio family.

References

1987 establishments in Portugal
Defunct magazines published in Portugal
Defunct newspapers published in Portugal
Defunct weekly newspapers
Magazines established in 1987
Magazines disestablished in 1995
Newspapers published in Lisbon
Online newspapers with defunct print editions
Portuguese-language newspapers
Publications established in 1995
Publications disestablished in 2002
Mirante

External links